The 2022–23 Super League 2, known as Super League 2 betsson for sponsorship reasons, is the fourth season of the Super League 2, the second-tier Greek professional league for association football clubs, since the restructuring of the Greek football league system.

The season is set to start on 4 November 2022 and will finish in May 2023. The league will be conducted of 30 teams and two groups, this is due to the restructure and abolishment of the Football League. The B Teams of Olympiacos, PAOK, Panathinaikos and AEK Athens will also compete in the league for a second consecutive year. B Teams, however, are ineligible for promotion or relegation.

On 22 July 2022, Greek Football Federation decided the promotion of the winners of both groups, removing the past play off system that existed last season.

The league was indefinitely suspended on 2 February 2023 by an unanimous decision from all 30 teams, as the Minister of Sports Lefteris Avgenakis announced that €1,700,000 are to be awarded to the Super League 2 teams from taxation of betting companies instead of the €5,100,000 that the teams claim to have been agreed at the start of the season, leading to great financial instability for all of the teams. On 8 February 2023, Avgenakis declined having agreed to a total funding of €5,100,000, and stated that he will not discuss with the 30 teams unless they resume the league. On 22 February 2023, the Super League Greece 2 president Leoutsakos stated that he would resign if funding was found. On 8 March 2023, after Leoutsakos' resignation, Super League 2 elected Petros Martsoukos as a new president, and agreed to resume the championship, and opting to communicate with Avgenakis for funding, as Avgenakis had set a prerequisite for funding that Leoutsakos is removed from president of Super League 2.

Team changes

From Super League Greece 2
Promoted to Super League
 Levadiakos

Relegated to Gamma Ethniki
 Pierikos
 Kavala
 Olympiakos Volos
 Trikala
 Asteras Vlachioti
 Karaiskakis
 Rodos
 Zakynthos

Relegated to Local Championships
 Xanthi
 Ergotelis

To Super League Greece 2
Relegated from Super League
 Apollon Smyrni

Promoted from Gamma Ethniki
 Panachaiki
 Makedonikos
 Proodeftiki
 Ilioupoli
 Rouf
 Iraklis Larissa

North Group

Teams

Personnel and sponsoring

Managerial changes

League table

Results

South Group

Teams

Personnel and sponsoring

Managerial changes

League table

Results

Top scorers 

10 goals

  Denzel Jubitana (Iraklis)
  Panagiotis Moraitis (Apollon Smyrnis)

9 goals

  Andrews Tetteh (Kifisia)
  Kosta Aleksić (Iraklis)

8 goals

  Dijilly Vouho (O.F. Ierapetra)
6 goals

  Christos Rovas (Kalamata)
  Georgios Manalis (Chania)
  Giannis Loukinas (Athens Kallithea)
  Panagiotis Kynigopoulos (Athens Kallithea)
  Vladimir Bradonjić (PAOK B)
  Zisis Chatzistravos (PAOK B)
  Michalis Kouiroukidis (Kifisia)
  Florenç Keri (Panachaiki/Iraklis Larissa)

5 goals

  Giannis Parastatidis (Diagoras)
  Hicham Kanis (Panserraikos)
  Said Ahmed Said (Panserraikos)
  Josete Miranda (Niki Volos)
  Giannis Sardelis (Panathinaikos B)
  Michalis Bastakos (Ilioupoli)
  Giannis Pasas (Kalamata)
  Stelios Tsoukanis (Makedonikos)

4 goals

  Marios Ogkmpoe (AEL)
  Stefanos Tzimas (PAOK B)
  Chrysovalantis Kozoronis (Anagennisi Karditsa)
  Vasilios Triantafyllakos (Ilioupoli)
  Demethryus (Athens Kallithea)
  Andreas Vlachomitros (Egaleo)
  Iván Federico Müller (O.F. Ierapetra)

3 goals

  Georgios Zacharakis (Apollon Larissa)
  Ignacio Liporace (Panachaiki)
  Vangelis Alexopoulos (Panachaiki)
  Panagiotis Linardos (Panachaiki)
  Vasilios Gordeziani (PAOK B)
  Madih Talal (Kifisia)
  Damian Gjini (Kifisia)
  Nicolás Andereggen (O.F. Ierapetra/Kifisia)
  Michalis Kosidis (AEK Athens B)
  Paschalis Kassos (Niki Volos)
  Vasilios Fasidis (Veria)
  Florentin Bouoli (Veria)
  Bilal Mazhar (Panathinaikos B)
  Andreas Athanasakopoulos (Panathinaikos B)
  Stefanos Athanasiadis (Anagennisi Karditsa)
  Alberto Simoni (Makedonikos)
  Savvas Siatravanis (Apollon Larissa/Makedonikos)
  Fabricio Pedrozo (AEL)
  Stathis Belevonis (Apollon Pontus)
  Ierotheos Dritsas (Thesprotos)
  Vasilios Konstantinou (Thesprotos)
  Fatjon Andoni (Apollon Smyrnis)
  Giannis Bastianos (Egaleo)
  Christos Liatsos (Olympiacos B)

2 goals

  Gustavo Furtado (Panathinaikos B)
  Miguel Tavares (Panathinaikos B)
  Alexandros Bracjani (Makedonikos)
  Petros Orfanidis (Veria)
  Giannis Ioannou (Veria)
  Besar Halimi (Apollon Smyrnis)
  Maximiliano Cuadra (Apollon Smyrnis)
  Kyriakos Mazoulouxis (Kifisia)
  Nikos Peios (Kifisia)
  Manolis Kallergis (Kifisia)
  Theodoros Vernardos (Anagennisi Karditsa)
  Lampros Politis (Chania/Anagennisi Karditsa)
  Markos Nino (AEL)
  Alexandros Nikolias (AEL)
  Konstantinos Papageorgiou (AEL)
  Dimitrios Mavrias (AEL)
  Alen Melunović (Iraklis)
  Mathías Tomás (Iraklis)
  Giorgos Vourgountzis (Diagoras)
  Mubaraj Adeshina (Diagoras)
  Bogdan Stamenkovic (Diagoras)
  Serafim Maniotis (Diagoras)
  Rafail Pettas (Almopos Aridea)
  Vasilis Papadoupoulos (Almopos Aridea)
  Ioannis Kosti (Olympiacos B)
  Anestis Vlachomitros (Olympiacos B)
  Algassime Bah (Olympiacos B)
  Ilias Tsiligiris (Egaleo)
  Spyros Rousis (Thesprotos)
  Vasilios Tsimopoulos (Thesprotos)
  Óscar Siafá (Niki Volos)
  Luka Milunović (Niki Volos)
  Vasilios Gavriilidis (Niki Volos)
  Christos Kalousis (Apollon Larissa)
  Giannis Michailidis (PAOK B)
  Argyris Darelas (PAOK B)
  Omiros Syrengelas (Iraklis Larissa)
  Diego Casas (Iraklis Larissa)
  Efthymis Christopoulos (AEK Athens B)
  Brian Esalo (Apollon Pontus)
  Alexandros Arnarellis (Kalamata)
  Charalampos Pavlidis (Proodeftiki)
  Giannis Bourlakis (Panachaiki)
  Savvas Mourgos (Panserraikos)
  Aristotelis Karasalidis (Panserraikos)
  Marios Sofianos (Panserraikos)
  Konstantinos Itsios (O.F. Ierapetra)
  Antonis Kyriazis (Rouf)
  Thomas Vasiliou (Ilioupoli)
  Alexis Koutsias (Episkopi)

References

External links
Official website 

2
Second level Greek football league seasons
Greece
Current association football seasons